The Carnival in Rio de Janeiro (Portuguese: Carnaval do Rio de Janeiro) is a festival held every year before Lent; it is considered the biggest carnival in the world, with two million people per day on the streets. The first Carnival festival in Rio occurred in 1723. 

The typical Rio carnival parade is filled with revelers, floats, and adornments from numerous samba schools which are located in Rio (more than 200 approximately, divided into five leagues/divisions).  A samba school is composed of a collaboration of local neighbours that want to attend the carnival together, with some kind of regional, geographical and common background.

There is a special order that every school has to follow with their parade entries.  Each school begins with the "comissão de frente" (meaning "Front Commission"), that is the group of people from the school that appear first.  Made of ten to fifteen people, the comissão de frente introduces the school and sets the mood and style of their presentation.  These people have choreographed dances in elaborate costumes that usually tell a short story.  Following the "comissão de frente" is the first float of the samba school, called "abre-alas" ("Opening Wing"). These are followed by the Mestre-sala and Porta-Bandeira ("Master of Ceremonies and Flag Bearer"), with one to four pairs, one active and three reserve, to lead the dancers, which include the old guard veterans and the "ala das baianas", with the drum line battery at the rear and sometimes a brass section and guitars.

History 
The Rio Carnival celebration dates back to the 1650s. During that time, elaborate feasts were organized to give honor to the Greek wine gods.  The Romans used to worship Bacchus, the god of the grape-harvest. 
The festival ‘Entrudo’ was introduced by the Portuguese and this inspired the birth of the Carnival in Brazil. In 1840, the very first Rio masquerade took place, and polka and waltz took center stage.
Africans subsequently influenced the Carnival with the introduction of Samba music in 1917, which is now considered a traditional Brazilian form.

There was no carnival in 1915–18 or 1940–45. Once more it was canceled with strict warnings against clandestine celebrations in 2021 due to the COVID-19 pandemic in Brazil and was postponed in 2022 for similar reasons. It returned in 2023.

Samba school parade 

The first Samba school parades were held in Praça Onze region, now the neighborhood of Cidade Nova, also known as “Big Africa”, the birthplace of the Carioca Carnival parade as it is known today, where a huge number of Afro-Brazilians had have a presence since the 1890s and the beginning of the Republic. The pre-existing traditions of ranches and Cordão carnavalesco that dated from the Empire among the free African communities, which would be combined into carnival blocks by the 1920s, would evolve into their ultimate form - the Rio samba school.

Future Estácio de Sá, together with Portela and Estação Primeira de Mangueira paraded for the first time in the city in 1929. All three were former carnival blocks which transformed into schools with professional staffing and city support. In 1930, seven schools were already active in the city. With the works of in Avenida Presidente Vargas, the parade moved there, and from 1942 to 1945 the parade was held in São Januário. From 1952 temporary stands for the public were annually assembled, and in 1961 paid tickets made their debut to take advantage of the rising international and national interest and the increasing tourist arrivals. In 1974, due to the works of the subway, the parade was held on Avenida Presidente Antônio Carlos, from where it was also broadcast for the first time in color television. In 1978, the parade was transferred to the Marquês de Sapucaí Avenue, where it remains up to this day. In 1983, the then governor Leonel Brizola commissioned the architect Oscar Niemeyer the project of a permanent local stadium for the parades in that same area, because until then the bleachers had continued to be temporary, and only assembled and disassembled for the event.

With the increase in the number of schools taking part, which made the parade longer and tiring for the public, in 1984 the parade was separated into two dates and categories: Friday evening into Saturday morning for the lower-level schools; and Sunday evening into Monday morning for the major schools, including the more recognizable ones. That year, a “super-champion” school was also announced following the parade of the champions that took place the following Saturday, which by that time were awarded for the best performances of the past nights of competition. Since this practice was never again repeated, Mangueira remains the only samba school to ever be awarded with the title and dignity of "super-champion" of the annual event. Portela is the samba school that has the largest number of championships with 22.

The schools of the Special Group under LIESA parade over two days (Sunday and Monday), while the A Series schools parade on Friday and Saturday under LIERJ, which also has the B Series, which parades on Fat Tuesday. Both organizations were under the AESCRJ banner before it lost organizing rights, thus also providing for the establishment of new organizations like LIESB and Samba é Nosso for the lower level divisions. The Gold Division (A Series) champion school which advances directly as a participant in the Special Group for the next year's Carnival parades last on Carnival Monday while the Special Group champion parades once more on the Saturday after Ash Wednesday.

As of 2018, LIESB handed over the management of the E series and its schools to ACAS, which now operates it as a rookie level organization for samba schools, in 2020 the C Series (Silver Division) fell under a new organization, LIVRES, with LIESB handling the divisions above and below it.

Dates
Rio's Carnival begins on the Friday preceding Lent and ends on Ash Wednesday, but the Winners' Parade happens on the Saturday after the carnival ends. The winning school and runners' up of the Special Group, as well as the A Series champion school, all march past one final time in front of their supporters on this night.
 February 21 to 26, 2020
 February 12 to 17, 2021 (cancelled due to COVID-19 pandemic)
 April 20 to April, 2022 (moved up due to COVID-19 and coincide with Tiradentes' Day)
 February 17 to 22, 2023

Tickets

In 1984, the government decided to give Rio Carnival its new home in the Sambadrome. Today, some of the most famous events of Rio Carnival are ticketed events. There are different types of Sambadrome tickets that are available for purchase. Grandstand tickets are general admissions tickets that are available on a first-come, first-served basis and are not allocated ahead of time. Frisas are open air box seats located along the samba runway. Camarotes are luxury boxes situated between the frisas and the grandstands. Sector 9 is the tourist sector which are the same as grandstand tickets, with the difference being that they are allocated so people have assigned seats.

Carnival ticket prices can vary depending on the ticket type, sector and season. The cheapest sectors are 12 and 13. Tickets can be bought in advance through international brokers, or through local travel agents in Rio de Janeiro. 'Purchase of a ticket' normally means purchase of a voucher which is then exchangeable for the ticket close to the date. Ticket sales are organised by LIESA, who will often also make tickets available at late notice via a venue (often a bank) announced the day before. LIESA prices for grandstand tickets vary from Rs5 to Rs500 for the Tourist Sector (2014 prices) (Rs500 = approx. US$250). LIESA publish the base price of the tickets, and agents and brokers charge more (sometimes significantly more) but offer considerable convenience and other benefits.

Street carnival

As the parade is taking place in the Sambadrome and the balls are being held in the Copacabana Palace and beach, many carnival participants are at other locations. Street festivals are very common during carnival and are highly populated by the locals. Elegance and extravagance are usually left behind, but music and dancing are still extremely common. Anyone is allowed to participate in the street festivals. Bandas are very familiar with the street carnival especially because it takes nothing to join in on the fun except to jump in. One of the most well known bandas of Rio is Banda de Ipanema. Banda de Ipanema was first created in 1965 and is known as Rio's most irreverent street band.

Incorporated into every aspect of the Rio carnival are dancing and music.  The most famous dance is carnival samba, a Brazilian dance with African influences. The samba remains a popular dance not only in carnival but in the ghettos outside of the main cities.  These villages keep alive the historical aspect of the dance without the influence of the western cultures.

Music is another major part of all aspects of the carnival. As stated by Samba City, "Samba Carnival Instruments are an important part of Brazil and the Rio de Janeiro carnival, sending out the irresistible beats and rhythms making the crowd explode in a colourful dance revolution fantasy fest!"   The samba that is found in Rio is Battucanada, referring to the dance and music being based on percussion instruments.  It "is born of a rhythmic necessity that it allows you to sing, to dance, and to parade at the same time."   This is why the batucada style is found in most all of Rio's street carnivals.

Street parades, blocos, and bandas take place throughout the city of Rio during Carnival, the most famous and largest carnival celebration of the world. There can be more than 300 bandas taking place at any given point in time. While the biggest street party takes place right outside the Sambadrome, the largest organized street dance is typically found on Cinelândia Square in Rio's Centro. In 2012, more than 2 million revelers took to the streets of Rio de Janeiro to participate in the Cordão da Bola Preta bloco. According to police estimates, more than 5 million people attended a bloco during Rio Carnival 2012 and there was not one reported incident of crime.

When the Sambadrome was built in 1984, it had the side-effect of taking street parades from the downtown area to a specific, ticketed performance area. Some samba schools have since been motivated by an agenda that focuses on regaining public space, and using the carnival tradition to occupy the streets with parades or blocos. Many of these represent a local community of the area but are open to all.

Several of the Rio street carnival blocks that hold the parties are affiliated to the Rio de Janeiro State Street Carnival Blocks Federation  (FBCERJ), established in 1965.

Corte real

King Momo

Queens of Carnival
The Queen of the Carnival in Rio de Janeiro and up to two princesses having the duty to woo the revelry, along with the King Momo. Unlike some cities, in the city of Rio de Janeiro, Queens of Carnival do not see a certain school of samba. In competitions, princesses are usually placed as second and third, and are correspondingly 1st and 2nd Princess. Some of them after the reign become queens or battery bridesmaids.

See also
 Brazilian Carnival
 Tourism in Brazil
 Culture of Brazil

References

External links

 Official website of Rio Carnival
  Brazilian Carnival Glossary of Terms in English
 Rio Carnival photos 2010,13*
 Carnival in Rio: Crazy, Sexy, Weird  – slideshow by Life magazineadvanced searcher of America by R.G.
 Carnival in Rio: An Online documentary about the Carnival of Rio de Janeiro
 Brasiltropicalshow.com